El Boalo is a Spanish village of around 6000 inhabitants,  north west of Madrid, in the Community of Madrid.

Bus 

 672: Cerceda - Moralzarzal - Madrid (Moncloa)

 724: El Boalo - Manzanares el Real - Madrid (Plaza de Castilla)

External links 
village website

Municipalities in the Community of Madrid